Greatest Hits is the first greatest hits compilation to be released by American country music band Sawyer Brown. It was released in 1990 on Capitol Records, and it features nine singles from the band's first six albums, as well as the track "When Love Comes Callin'", which was released as a single. No songs from Somewhere in the Night or Wide Open are included, despite the former yielding a No. 2 hit ("This Missin' You Heart of Mine").

Track listing

Charts

Weekly charts

Year-end charts

Certifications

Notes 

1990 greatest hits albums
Sawyer Brown compilation albums
Capitol Records compilation albums